The 2008 Wimbledon Men's Singles final was the championship tennis match of the men's singles tournament at the 2008 Wimbledon Championships. A part of the storied Federer–Nadal rivalry, it pitted then-top ranked Roger Federer against then second-ranked Rafael Nadal. After 4 hours and 48 minutes of play, Nadal defeated Federer 6–4, 6–4, 6–7(5–7), 6–7(8–10), 9–7. The match is regarded by many as the greatest tennis match ever played.

Background

Roger Federer and Rafael Nadal have a storied rivalry that many consider to be the greatest in tennis history. As they entered the 2008 Wimbledon Championships, the two men had combined to win 14 of the previous 16 Grand Slam titles.

The 2008 Wimbledon Men's Singles final was the third consecutive year in which Federer and Nadal had met in the finals of Wimbledon. Federer had won not only both previous meetings, but had also been the Wimbledon champion the previous five years.

Nadal, on the other hand, had just won the French Open for the fourth time in a row, having defeated Federer in their third consecutive final encounter, and was trying to achieve the rare French Open-Wimbledon double (Channel Slam). This feat was known to be extremely difficult because it required the player to make the switch from a slow clay surface to a fast grass surface within a month. In the Open Era of tennis, only two men had previously achieved this feat: Rod Laver and Björn Borg. Since this showdown match, Federer has completed the Roland-Garros/Wimbledon double in 2009, Nadal achieved the feat for the second time in 2010, and Novak Djokovic achieved it in 2021.

Federer contracted mononucleosis around December 2007 and received medical clearance to train normally and compete on 20 February 2008, five days before the 2008 Dubai Tennis Championships started. Some analysts wondered whether his physical recovery was complete by the time of Wimbledon. Others disagreed and considered that Federer's vestiges of fatigue were no longer visible during the 2008 clay season. On the other hand, in an interview for Movistar, Nadal stated that his foot was severely injured, requiring anesthesia before the match, and "had to play with my foot asleep".

Match details

Although the players were due on court at 14:00 BST on 6 July 2008, rain delayed the start of the match by about 35 minutes.

Nadal won the first two sets 6–4, 6–4, but the rain stopped play once again, with Federer leading in the third set 5–4. After an 80-minute break for the weather, Federer battled back to win the next two sets, 7–6, 7–6, saving two championship points in the fourth set tiebreak. The tiebreak is often regarded as one of the greatest ever played. With the score at 5–2, Nadal had the opportunity to win the title on his next two serves. However, he double faulted, then netted a backhand, bringing the tiebreak back on serve. Nadal saved a set point and had his first championship point, but failed to return Federer's serve. At 7–7, Nadal hit a forehand down the line past Federer, setting up another championship point, this time on his serve, but Federer responded with a backhand down the line to extend the match. BBC commentator Andrew Castle said, "The two best passing shots of the tournament, without doubt, have just taken place on the last two points." A second rain delay at 19:53 BST kept the players in the locker room for another 30 minutes. When they returned onto the court, darkness had already started setting in, threatening to delay the match until the next day. During the deciding set, Federer was two points away from claiming his sixth consecutive Wimbledon crown, but Nadal ultimately held serve and eventually broke Federer's serve in the 15th game of the set. Nadal then served out the match in the following game and won the final set 9–7, claiming his first Wimbledon and fifth Grand Slam tournament singles title. The match ended in near darkness at 21:15 BST.

During the match, Federer only converted one of thirteen break points on Nadal's serve.

It was the last Wimbledon final to be significantly affected by rain, as a retractable roof was being installed at Centre Court and was in place by the 2009 Wimbledon Championships.

Statistics

Significance

At 4 hours and 48 minutes, the match at the time was the longest singles final at Wimbledon in terms of time played. It was overtaken by the 2019 men's singles final, another match involving Federer, in which he lost to Novak Djokovic.

Federer had won five consecutive titles at Wimbledon (2003-2007), a record shared with Björn Borg. At Wimbledon 2008, Federer attempted to surpass Borg's record, and become the first male player in the Open Era to win six consecutive Wimbledon titles. Nadal defeated Federer at his most successful major and ended his 41-match winning streak at Wimbledon. By winning the match, Nadal achieved the rare French Open–Wimbledon double, joining (at the time) Rod Laver and Björn Borg as the only men to do so in the Open Era. Federer achieved the same feat the following year, with Nadal winning the double once again in 2010.

Two months later, in August, Nadal finally overtook Federer in the ATP rankings, ending Federer's reign as world no. 1 at a record 237 consecutive weeks. Many tennis analysts wondered whether 2008 was the beginning of Federer's decline in favour of the younger Nadal. Federer, however, regained the top ranking on three occasions, after winning Wimbledon in 2009 and 2012 and the Rotterdam Open in 2018.

Notes

References

External links
 Match details at the official ATP site
 The full match in HD
 Extended highlights

Men's Singles Final
2008
Rafael Nadal tennis matches
Roger Federer tennis matches